"The Men All Pause" is a hit single recorded by Klymaxx for the MCA label. Written by Bernadette Cooper and Joyce Irby, this song was recorded and released as the first single off their fourth album, Meeting in the Ladies Room. This song reached number 5 on the Billboard R&B chart, number 80 on the Billboard Hot 100, and number 9 on the Billboard Hot Dance Club Play chart. The success of this song helped the group's Meeting in the Ladies Room album reach Platinum status.

Credits
Lead vocals: Bernadette Cooper and Joyce Irby
Background vocals: Klymaxx

Peak positions

References

1984 singles
Klymaxx songs
1984 songs
MCA Records singles
Songs written by Joyce Irby